Protodinychidae is a small family of mites in the order Mesostigmata, containing the single genus Protodinychus.

Species
Protodinychus comprises three recognised species:
 Protodinychus punctatus Evans, 1957
 Protodinychus ainscoughi Hutu & Calugar, 2002
 Protodinychus evansi Hutu & Calugar, 2002

References

Mesostigmata